"Hide and Seek" is the leading track of Japanese star Namie Amuro's 2007 album Play. It is one of the two new songs (the other being "Hello") to have a music video and is being used to promote the album. It has dance, hip hop, and R&B tones and has a synthesized voice in the verses. Namie Amuro has stated in an interview that "Hide & Seek" was the perfect song to open the album because of its "marching band" feel at the beginning of the song. Amuro won the "Best R&B Video" prize for the song at the MTV Video Music Awards Japan 2008.

Music video 
The video's theme is featured on the cover of Namie Amuro's album Play. The video features Namie Amuro and six male dancers doing choreography amid cranes. Also, there are small television screens displaying her image upon them while singing. Namie is also seen dancing behind police caution tape, and other times plainly against a blinding white background wearing a sleeveless shirt. At one point during the bridge, she is singing on a motorcycle with the dancers playing trumpets.

Certifications

References

External links
Hide & Seek Video

Namie Amuro songs
2007 songs
2005 songs
Avex Trax singles